Here are lists of entertainment events at Central Harbourfront Event Space, Central Harbourfront.

2016

2017

2018

2019

2021

2022

2023

References

Entertainment events in Hong Kong
Events in Hong Kong
Lists of events by venue
Music events in Hong Kong